George Tandy Jr. is an American R&B-soul singer-songwriter. His debut single, "March", was released in 2013 and peaked on the Billboard R&B charts the following year.

Biography
Tandy was born and raised in Virginia, where he learned to play several instruments. His stepmother, Candi, a vocal coach and artist developer, encouraged him to move to Florida to pursue singing, songwriting, and playing keyboards while working as a hip-hop dancer. 
Tandy later found work as a barista at Starbucks, where he gave a copy of his demo to Cima Georgevich, a frequent customer who was also the CEO of RedStar Entertainment. 
The label signed Tandy and released his debut single, "March", in September 2013. The song, produced with the help of Tandy's jazz musician father, George Sr., entered the Billboard US Adult R&B chart later that month and peaked at number three in March 2014.

Discography
The Foundation EP (2014)

Singles

References

External links

George Tandy Jr. interview on The Steve Harvey Morning Show (March 18, 2014)

Living people
21st-century American singers
American rhythm and blues singer-songwriters
American male singer-songwriters
American contemporary R&B singers
Singer-songwriters from Virginia
21st-century American male singers
Year of birth missing (living people)